Metal Combat: Falcon's Revenge is a light gun shooter video game developed by Nintendo and Intelligent Systems and published by Nintendo for the Super Nintendo Entertainment System in 1993. It is the sequel to Battle Clash and like its predecessor, it requires the use of the Super Scope peripheral in order to be played.

Plot
Three years have passed since Anubis suffered defeat at the hand of Mike Anderson. A new age of prosperity has begun to emerge and along with it, the rebirth of some of earth's great cities. But just as quickly as he disappeared following his defeat, Anubis has reappeared to resume his tyranny. Again the player must join Mike and attempt to crush the iron rule of Anubis before he can once more throw the earth back into the darkest of ages.

Afterwards, Anubis reveals that he is only a small portion of a much larger threat. A race of aliens called the Eltorians have come to conquer Earth, and the Solar System must be defended from their advancing forces. Near the end of the plot an enormous spaceship called "Eltoria" emerges where Mike must go to battle Anubis.

Gameplay
Like the previous game, Battle Clash, Metal Combat is a Super Scope-based light gun game with a one-on-one, all-boss battle format. The player has an ordinary blaster which can be charged as well as access to an array of limited-use special items. In addition the player can choose between two STs, the Falcon and the Tornado. The Falcon is piloted by Mike and the Tornado is piloted by a female character named Carol Eugene. The gameplay changes slightly based on the pilot chosen. Metal Combat also features a tutorial mode, in which a female character named Rola assists in the player character's training.

Reception
Metal Combat: Falcon's Revenge received mostly mixed reviews. The four reviewers of Electronic Gaming Monthly gave the game a 7.75 out of 10 average. Though one of the reviewers disliked the game, commenting, "The difficulty isn't hard enough until the later levels where it becomes extremely frustrating," most of the reviewers praised the game as having colorful graphics and deeper gameplay than most Super Scope games, and cited the two-player mode as the best feature. GamePro described the game as "much tougher, faster, and ultimately better than any Super Scope game before it, including Battle Clash", especially praising the detailed graphics which allow the player to spot enemy weak points. However, they criticized the text between fights and the low quality voices.

References

External links
 Official Intelligent Systems website (Original)
 

1993 video games
Intelligent Systems games
Light gun games
Nintendo Research & Development 1 games
Super Nintendo Entertainment System games
Super Nintendo Entertainment System-only games
Video game sequels
Video games set in New York City
Nintendo games
Video games about mecha
Multiplayer and single-player video games
Video games developed in Japan
Video games set in the 21st century
Video games with alternate endings
Video games set in Mongolia
Video games scored by Yuka Tsujiyoko